This is a list of ice hockey players who were drafted in the National Hockey League Entry Draft by the Winnipeg Jets (1972–1996). It includes every player who was drafted, regardless of whether they played for the team.

Key
 Played at least one game with the Jets
 Spent entire NHL career with the Jets
() Inducted into the Hockey Hall of Fame
() Number retired by the Jets

Draft picks

WHA
Statistics show each player's career regular season totals in the WHA.

NHL

See also
List of Winnipeg Jets (1972–96) players
1979 NHL Expansion Draft
List of Phoenix Coyotes draft picks

References

 
 
 
 
 

Draft
 
 
Winnipeg Jets (1972–1996)